Mukim Saba is a mukim in Brunei-Muara District, Brunei. It is part of Kampong Ayer, the traditional stilted settlements on the Brunei River in the capital Bandar Seri Begawan. The population was 1,000 in 2016. It encompasses the village of Kampong Saba.

Demographics 
As of 2016 census, the population of Mukim Saba comprised 520 males and 480 females. The mukim had 144 households occupying 144 dwellings. The entire population lived in urban areas.

Administration 
For administrative purposes the mukim comprises the following village subdivisions:

Facilities 
Saba Darat Primary School is the sole primary school in the mukim. There is also Raja Isteri Pengiran Anak Saleha Religious School, which provides Islamic religious primary education which is compulsory for Muslim pupils in the country.

The  is the village mosque; the construction began in 1988 and completed in the following year. It can accommodate 500 worshippers.

References 

Saba
Brunei-Muara District